La supertestimone is a 1971 Italian film directed by Franco Giraldi. For this film Monica Vitti was awarded with a Globo d'oro  for Best Actress.

Plot 

Marino Bottecchia, known as "Moccasin", lives on Tiziana, a prostitute his lover of whom he is the pimp. One Friday evening the girl is found killed: Marino, immediately suspected, proves to have an alibi. From the photos in the newspapers, which devote ample space to the squalid event and to its characters, Isolina Pantò - extravagant owner of a private asylum and former servant in a convent - recognizes the suspect whom she remembers seeing at the crime scene. The detailed and precise testimony of her sentenced Bottecchia to 20 years in prison, demolishing both the alibi and the testimonies in his favor. Isolina, who lives alone, has a friend who got married on the Thursday before the day of Tiziana's murder. This circumstance, reminded her by the bride, convinces Isolina that she has fallen into error. She repented, resorted to the judicial authority and obtained a review of the trial: Marino was not released, but sentenced to four years of imprisonment for minor offenses that emerged during the trial. Determined to make amends, Isolina lovingly assists the inmate, even moving to nearby the penitentiary in order to be closer to him. In short, the two end up falling in love and get married in prison. Finally free, Marino - after pretending not to be able to get a job - induces Isolina into prostitution and, when the woman shows that she is too fond of a client, he does not hesitate to reveal to her that he was the one to kill Tiziana.

Cast 
 Monica Vitti: Isolina Pantò
 Ugo Tognazzi: Marino Bottecchia
Orazio Orlando: warden
Véronique Vendell: sister of Isolina
Filippo De Gara: inspector
Franco Balducci: an inmate
Nerina Montagnani: mother of an inmate
Roy Bosier: an inmate
Ennio Antonelli: a witness

References

External links

1971 films
Commedia all'italiana
Films directed by Franco Giraldi
Italian comedy films
Italian black comedy films
1970s black comedy films
Films scored by Luis Bacalov
Films about miscarriage of justice
1970s prison films
Films with screenplays by Ruggero Maccari
1971 comedy films
1971 drama films
1970s Italian-language films
1970s Italian films